North Carolina Highway 28 (NC 28) is an  primary state highway in the U.S. state of North Carolina.  The highway runs north–south through the Nantahala National Forest in Western North Carolina.

Route description
NC 28 is part of a three-state highway 28, that totals , from Beech Island, South Carolina to Deals Gap. Southward the road continues as Georgia State Route 28.  This is the sole state highway that keeps its exact number as it crosses between Georgia and North Carolina. It heads southeast briefly through Georgia, enters South Carolina as South Carolina Highway 28, re-enters Georgia once more before terminating in South Carolina.

NC 28 starts at the Georgia state line in Macon County. From the state line, it follows a winding course northwards to Highlands.  There it begins a  concurrency with U.S. Route 64 (US 64) on the way northwest to Franklin. Following an interchange with US 23 and US 441, the US 64 concurrency ends and enters the downtown business district of the city. NC 28 forms a concurrency with US 441 Business on the one-way pair of Main Street and Palmer Street. The two roads cross the Little Tennessee River before NC 28 breaks off and heads north out of the city on Harrison Avenue. Though the official routing of the highway is along Harrison Avenue, signage shows NC 28 traveling along Depot Street and Riverview Street bypassing the city downtown.

From Franklin it travels north-northwest, mostly following the Little Tennessee River valley.  There is a  concurrency with US 19 and US 74 between the unincorporated communities of Lauada and Needmore.  From Needmore, it follows a westerly course along the southern shore of man-made Fontana Lake.  A side road crosses the TVA constructed Fontana Dam; NC 28 skirts the southern boundary of the Great Smoky Mountains National Park before reaching its northern terminus at US 129.

NC 28 overlaps with two state scenic byways: the Waterfall Byway, between Highlands and Franklin,  and the Indian Lake Scenic Byway, between Almond and Deals Gap.  NC 28 also overlaps parts of the Mountain Waters Scenic Byway, a National Forest Scenic Byway, that traverses through the Nantahala National Forest.

History
Established in 1938 as the third and current NC 28, it traversed from Georgia to Highlands, where it duplexed with US 64 to Franklin.  Continuing northeast from Franklin, it replaced NC 286 to end at US 19, in Lauada.  In 1940, NC 28 was extended northeast along US 19 through Bryson City and Ela, then replaced part of NC 107, ending in Cherokee.  In 1947, NC 28 was truncated back to its former northern terminus; its former routing to Cherokee becoming US 19A.  In 1954, NC 28 was extended southwest along US 19 to Almond and then northwest along new primary routing to Fontana, then replaced NC 288 to its current northern terminus at Deals Gap.  In 1974, NC 28 was adjusted to one-way streets in downtown Franklin, in concurrency with US 441 Bus, via Main Street and Palmer Street.

The first NC 28 was an original state highway that traversed from NC 10, in Andrews, through Franklin, Highlands, Rosman, Brevard and Hendersonville, to NC 20, in Bat Cave. In 1923, NC 28 was rerouted west of Franklin on new primary routing to Elf and Hayesville, then replacing NC 109 from Hayesville to NC 10, in Murphy. In 1929, NC 28 was extended west from Murphy along new primary routing to the Tennessee state line. Also in 1932, US 64 was assigned along NC 28 from the Tennessee state line to Old Fort. In 1934, all of NC 28 was decommissioned in favor of US 64 and US 221.

The second NC 28 existed from 1935-1938, where it had replaced NC 21 between Fayetteville and Delco, through Elizabethtown.  It was renumbered as NC 87.

North Carolina Highway 282

North Carolina Highway 282 (NC 282) was established as a new primary routing from the Georgia state line to Highlands.  In 1938, NC 282 was renumbered as part of NC 28.

North Carolina Highway 286

North Carolina Highway 286 (NC 286) was an original state highway that began from the Georgia state line, near Otto, to NC 10, along Old Alarka Road.  In 1927, NC 286 was renumbered as an extension of NC 285, from the Georgia state line to Franklin. Around 1938, NC 286 was replaced by NC 28 and moved to the north terminus to the community of Swain (today known as Lauada).

North Carolina Highway 288

North Carolina Highway 288 (NC 288) was a primary route that served the Fontana area from 1929-1944 and revived again from 1951-1954.  The first NC 288 traversed from NC 108, in Deals Gap, to NC 10, in Bryson City. In 1942, construction began on Fontana Dam; which by 1944, NC 288 was decommissioned when a majority of the route was submerged.  Various sections of the old highway still exist on higher ground and are incorporated in hiking trails that are easily reachable from the Fontana Dam parking area.  The second NC 288 was a return along the western part of the highway that wasn't submerged, linking to the relocated Fontana community.  In 1954, new construction was completed between Fontana and Almond, and all of NC 288 was renumbered NC 28.

NC 288 was originally to be rebuilt along the north shore of Fontana Lake by the National Park Service, an agreement that was made between the county, state, and federal government.  Construction of New Fontana Road (SR 1364) was completed in 1958, connecting Bryson City to the border of the Great Smoky Mountains National Park.  From 1960-1970,  was built within the park, which was called Lakeview Drive; ending just west of a tunnel, that went through aptly named Tunnel Ridge.  Since then, questions about the cost of building the highway and the environmental impact of the road had stopped all further construction.  Known unofficially as "the Road to Nowhere," it provides access to various hiking trails within the National Park. After being in limbo for forty years, it was finally resolved in February 2010 when the U.S. Department of Interior signed a settlement agreement paying Swain County $52 million instead of building the highway. As of September 2017, only $12.8 million of that has been paid.  Four million additional dollars were released by Interior Secretary Ryan Zinke, and the final installment of $35.2 million was paid on June 29, 2018.  However, under a 2010 agreement, the money was deposited with the state treasurer's office. Swain County can spend only the interest the money earns.

Major intersections

See also
 North Carolina Bicycle Route 2 - concurrent with NC 28 from Cullasaja to downtown Franklin

References

External links

Carolina Lost - The Road to Nowhere
NCRoads.com: N.C. 28
NCRoads.com: N.C. 282
NCRoads.com: N.C. 286
NCRoads.com: N.C. 288

028
Transportation in Macon County, North Carolina
Transportation in Swain County, North Carolina
Transportation in Graham County, North Carolina